Ablaberoides maynei is a species of beetles. No sub-species listed at the Catalogue of Life.

References

Melolonthinae